Rainbow Machine is a public art work by American artist Joseph Burlini, located on the campus of Marquette University in downtown Milwaukee, Wisconsin.

Description
The work consists of four tall steel poles affixed with moving holographic arms. Each pole is 12 feet tall and has a six-foot arm on each side that swivels at the center point. The face of each arm is covered with a holographic decal that reflects light, color and motion as the arm moves. The work is oriented toward the Marquette Interchange a short distance from the entrance of the Haggerty Museum of Art.

History
While fabricated in 1993, Rainbow Machine was not installed in Milwaukee until 2000. According to the Haggerty Art Museum, it was previously installed on Michigan Avenue in Chicago.

Artist
Burlini is a graduate of the School of the Art Institute of Chicago and maintains a studio in Arlington Heights, Illinois.

References

1993 sculptures
Holography
Marquette University
Outdoor sculptures in Milwaukee